Nikolay Kostov (born 2 July 1963) is a Bulgarian football manager and former footballer who most recently managed Shakhter Karagandy.

Career
Much of his coaching career has taken place in Cyprus. His first coaching role in the country was at Anorthosis, where he won the Cypriot Cup in 2002. In 2006, he joined Olympiakos Nicosia, but was replaced by Juan Ramon Rocha in October 2006. He was the coach for Metalurh Donetsk from 2008 to 2010, a role from which he resigned in November 2010.

On 4 November 2011, he was revealed as the new manager of Levski Sofia. His contract ran until the end of the 2011–12 season. He resigned from his position on 26 March 2012, after enduring his first and only defeat with the club - a 0:1 home loss against Minyor Pernik. In late July 2012, Kostov was appointed as the new head coach of Karpaty Lviv.

Botev Plovdiv 
On 11 November 2015, Nikolay Kostov was appointed as the new head coach of Botev Plovdiv. On 24 August 2016, Kostov was dismissed from Botev Plovdiv.

Honours
Anorthosis
Cypriot Cup: 2002

References

External links 
 Profile at LevskiSofia.info
 

1963 births
Living people
People from Dobrich
Association football midfielders
Bulgarian footballers
Bulgarian expatriate footballers
First Professional Football League (Bulgaria) players
Second Professional Football League (Bulgaria) players
Cypriot First Division players
PFC Dobrudzha Dobrich players
PFC Levski Sofia players
PFC Slavia Sofia players
PFC Spartak Varna players
Anorthosis Famagusta F.C. players
Expatriate footballers in Cyprus
Bulgarian football managers
Bulgarian expatriate football managers
Anorthosis Famagusta F.C. managers
AEK Larnaca FC managers
FC Urartu managers
FC Metalurh Donetsk managers
Olympiakos Nicosia managers
PFC Levski Sofia managers
FC Karpaty Lviv managers
SC Tavriya Simferopol managers
Ukrainian Premier League managers
Botev Plovdiv managers
FC Tosno managers
FC Stal Kamianske managers
FC Shakhter Karagandy managers
FC Caspiy managers
Expatriate football managers in Ukraine
Expatriate football managers in Russia
Expatriate football managers in Cyprus
Expatriate football managers in Armenia
Bulgarian expatriate sportspeople in Russia
Bulgarian expatriate sportspeople in Ukraine
Bulgarian expatriate sportspeople in Cyprus
Bulgarian expatriate sportspeople in Armenia